is a shōjo manga written by Sukehiro Tomita and illustrated by Nao Yazawa that was originally serialized in Shogakukan's Ciao magazine. In North America, it was translated and published by VIZ Media in its entirety, consisting of six volumes.

The manga was later adapted into an anime television series directed by Kunihiko Yuyama that ran for 51 episodes on TV Tokyo, from April 5, 1995 to March 27, 1996 as well as 2 omakes Ai Tenshi Robot Wedding Peach and Ai Tenshi Sentai and a 4-episode OVA sequel (Wedding Peach DX) in 1996.

In 2004, Wedding Peach Young Love was released, a compilation of Wedding Peach stories made specifically for the monthly magazine Shogaku Sannensei ("Elementary School Third-Grader"). To better fit the magazine's target audience, the "Young Love" version of Wedding Peach features younger-looking characters, less complex storylines, and simpler dialogue.

Plot

Momoko Hanasaki, along with her friends Yuri Tanima and Hinagiku Tamano, are members of the newspaper club where they mostly cover the school's soccer team and all have a crush on the star player Kazuya Yanagiba. On their way home from school one day, they are attacked by a devil by the name of Pluie who is a servant to the high ruler of the devil world, Raindevila. When her friends are hypnotized into attacking Momoko, a beautiful man comes down from the sky named Limone, who is from the angel world and gives Momoko a compact case. Opening the compact, she is told by Aphrodite, the ruler of the angel world, that she is one of the legendary Love Angels, Wedding Peach. Momoko transforms into Wedding Peach and manages to snap her friends out of Pluie's control. Over the course of the story, Yuri and Hinagiku also find out that they are also love angels and the three must protect the humans from the devils and defeat Raindevila.

Media

Manga
The manga was written and illustrated by Nao Yazawa. It was serialized the Shogakukan's Ciao magazine from March 1994 to April 1996. Shogakukan released the manga in six volumes from September 1994 to April 1996. Viz Media licensed the manga in North America and released the manga from July 10, 2003 to May 26, 2004. The series is now out-of-print.

Anime
An anime television series premiered on TV Tokyo on April 5, 1995 to March 27, 1996 and ran for 51 episodes. The anime was directed by Kunihiko Yuyama and was co-produced by KSS and OLM, Inc. A four-episode OVA series, titled Wedding Peach DX (Deluxe) was released from November 1996 to March 1997. ADV Films licensed the anime in 2003 and released the anime in ten DVDs.

Theme Songs

Opening Themes
 "Dreaming Angels" (Eps. 1-27)
 Lyrics: Miho Matsuba / Composer: Ritsuko Okazaki / Arrangement: Masaki Iwamoto / Vocals: FURIL (Kyōko Hikami, Yūko Miyamura, Yukana Nogami) (Star Child Records)
 "Wedding Wars-Love Is A Flame" (Eps. 28-51)
 Lyrics: Arisu Sato / Composer: Kanji Saito, Akira Yamato / Arrangement: Anri Sekine / Vocals: Erina Nakajima (KSS Music)
 "Merry Angel" (DX Eps. 1-4)
 Lyrics: Arisu Sato / Composer: Kanji Saito / Arrangement: Kanji Saito / Vocals: FURIL' (Kyōko Hikami, Yūko Miyamura, Yukana Nogami, Yuka Imai) (KSS Music)

Ending Themes
 "21st Century Juliet" (Eps. 1-27)
 Lyrics: Yuriko Oda / Composer: Taka Kudou / Arrangement: Masaki Iwamoto / Vocals: FURIL (Star Child Records)
 "Virgin Love" (Eps. 28-51)
 Lyrics: Arisu Sato / Composer: Kanji Saito, Akira Yamato / Arrangement: Anri Sekine / Vocals: FURIL (KSS Music)
 "Sweet Little Love" (DX Eps. 1-4)
 Lyrics: Arisu Sato / Composer: Harukichi Yamamoto / Arrangement: Harukichi Yamamoto / Vocals: FURIL' (KSS Music)

Episodes

Wedding Peach

Wedding Peach DX

Omake

Games
A Super Famicom game was released only in Japan in 1995. In the game, the player plays as one of the three main girls (either Momoko, Yuri or Hinagiku) to compete with the others in a series of mini games. The ultimate goal is to win the right to ask the guy that all three girls are in love with (Yanagiba) to the school dance. The game has a three player option as well, where two other people can play the other two girls.

Wedding Peach games have also been released for the Game Boy (Jama-P Panic! - 1995) and PlayStation (Wedding Peach| Doki Doki Oiro-naoshi Fashion Dai-sakusen - 1996).

References

External links

1994 manga
1995 anime television series debuts
1996 anime OVAs
2004 manga
Japanese children's animated comedy television series
Japanese children's animated fantasy television series
ADV Films
Magical girl anime and manga
OLM, Inc.
Sentai anime and manga
Shogakukan manga
Shōjo manga
TV Tokyo original programming
Viz Media manga
Works about wedding